Beat is a free monthly tabloid-sized music magazine (street press) published and distributed in Melbourne, Australia. It was Melbourne's longest running street press, and one of the earliest street press after TAGG. Beat paused its print edition between March 2020-May 2022.

History 
The magazine changes its name from Beat to Beat Magazine in 1989, reverted to Beat in 2000, and continues to refer to itself as Beat Magazine on their website.

The magazine was founded as a weekly street press by Rob Furst and was printed by his company Furst Media. Between 1994 and 1998 a Sydney edition was printed, known as Beat : Sydney listings bible. The magazines and their online component were published each Wednesday, with the printed magazines distributed to nearly 1,000 locations in 1997. By 2020 the Melbourne edition was distributed to over 3,200 locations.

Beat's main competitor was Inpress, a Melbourne-based street press which was co-created by Rowena Sladdin in 1988 after she had left Beat.

In May 2012, 35,000 of the magazine copies were printed and distributed with a cartoon drawing of a naked man on its cover. The text "Sayonara, Bitches! It's been real" were written above the man's genitalia and many feared this would be Beat final issue. Beat explained on their website that the cover was meant to feature English band Kaiser Chiefs, but the cover had been swapped out by their typesetter on his last day of work as a prank.

Beat announced in 2019 they would begin publishing fortnightly, starting with issue #1673. Both the magazine and Beat's website were also redesigned at this time. The subject of the magazine also expanded beyond music, and now included video games, film, and television.

The print issue of Beat was suspended after issue #1695, published on 11 March 2020. The website has continued to be updated, and sends out a regular email newsletter to subscribers.

In May 2022 editor Lucas Radbourne announced the print issue had returned, and was available freely again as a monthly magazine.

References

External links 

 Official website
 Digital archive of issues (2012-2020)

Visual arts magazines
Music magazines published in Australia
Defunct magazines published in Australia
1986 establishments in Australia
Magazines established in 1986
Magazines disestablished in 2020
Magazines published in Melbourne
Weekly magazines published in Australia
Free magazines